Fios may refer to:

 Fíos, a parish in Parres, Spain
 Verizon Fios, bundled home communications service offered by Verizon Communications in the US
 FiOS from Frontier, the former name for Frontier FiberOptic, a bundled home communications service offered by Frontier Communications in the US
 FiOS1, a defunct news-based pay television network carried by Verizon Fios in the New York metropolitan area
 FIoS, after a name denotes Fellow of the Institute of Swimming

See also
 Telefios, a former Scottish Gaelic-language news programme
 Institute of Swimming, a swimming educational organisation based in Loughborough, Leicestershire.